"Palace & Main" is a song by Swedish alternative rock band Kent. It was released on 4 May 2005 as the second single from their album Du & Jag Döden. The song title refers to an intersection in Portland, Oregon. The single contains two B-sides: "Nihilisten" and "Alla mot Alla".

Music video
The music video is a documentary filmed on a simple DV-camera by the director Adam Berg (brother of lead singer Joakim Berg). It features guitarist Harri Mänty as he travels to Las Vegas to gamble the entire video budget of 300,000 kronor (roughly 50,000 USD) on the roulette. He puts the money on black, and wins. In the end of the video he rides away in a limousine, cheering and sipping champagne. Afterwards, the profits were donated to Barncancerfonden, a fund for children with cancer.

Track listing

Charts

References

Kent (band) songs
2005 singles
Number-one singles in Sweden
Songs written by Joakim Berg
Songs written by Martin Sköld
2005 songs